Diretta Stadio ... ed è subito goal! (known also with the acronym Diretta Stadio) is a Sports talk and debate television program produced by 7 Gold and aired on various affiliated local television channels in Italy, entirely devoted to Italian football, in particular the Serie A. Currently, it features live commentary of football matches by journalists who support various clubs (in particular Milan, Inter, Juventus and Napoli, with occasional guest commentaries from supporters of Fiorentina, Roma and Lazio, as well as discussion of international football and issues affecting the game.

Commentators and Presenters

Actual commentators and presenters
 Giovanna Martini
 Federico Bertone
 Francesco Bonfanti
 Paolo Marcello
 Tiziano Crudeli (Milan match commentator)
 Elio Corno
 Furio Fedele
 Franco Melli
 Antonio Paolino 
 Marika Fruscio
 Massimo Brambati
 Danilo Sarugia 
 Roberto Bettega 
 
 Mauro Bellugi 
 Filippo Tramontana (Inter match commentator)
 Gianni Solaroli 
 Fabio Santini 
 Giorgio Vitali 
 Carmelo Bongiovanni 
 Antonio Sabato (footballer)  
 Alessandro Ghigo  
 Paolo Specchia

E-mail
 Melissa Castagnoli
 Alessandra Magni
 Lara Denora
 Livia Ronca

Former commentators and presenters

 David Messina
 Evaristo Beccalossi
 Giorgio Micheletti
 Emilio Bianchi
 Andrea Bosio
 Giovanni Lodetti
 Corrado Fumagalli
 Alessandro Biolchi
 Francesco Gullo
 Mimmo Pesce (Napoli match commentator)
 Pietro Anastasi
 Michelangelo Rampulla

References

External links
Web site
7 Gold Streaming
Old web site

Italian sports television series
1999 Italian television series debuts
1990s Italian television series
2000s Italian television series
2010s Italian television series